Headmasters of Norwich School
People from Scarning
Year of birth unknown
Year of death unknown
Vincent of Scarning is one of the earliest known headmasters of any grammar school in England.  He was mentioned as the headmaster of Norwich School  in 1240.